Oleiros is a municipality of northwestern Spain in the province of A Coruña, in the autonomous community of Galicia. The whole municipality is basically a residential area and the vast majority of its residents commute on a daily basis to the neighbor city of A Coruña. Oleiros is the wealthiest municipality in Galicia, it enjoys very high living standards and is notably famous for its public gardens and for a very careful urban planning. The population is more dense in the four major urban areas of Oleiros: Santa Cristina-Perillo, Santa Cruz, Oleiros and Mera. The wealthiest inhabitants of Oleiros usually live in suburbs outside these urban areas. Many of these suburbs are composed of terraced or semidetached houses. Some rural areas still exist all across the municipality.

Geography 
Limits at north with the Ria of Betanzos, at east with Sada and Bergondo municipalities, at south with Cambre and Culleredo municipalities and at west with A Coruña municipality and Burgo River.

Demography 
From:INE Archiv

Notable natives
 Victor Moscoso (born 1936), graphic artist

References

External links
Weblog of Oleiros
Mayor Builds 8-metre Che Guevara Statue in Secret

Municipalities in the Province of A Coruña